Seri Kenangan Beach, also known as Tutong Beach, is a beach and spit in Kuala Tutong, Mukim Pekan Tutong, Tutong District. It is located at an estimated distance of 2 km west of Tutong town. It can also be noted that clay soils were found in the areas around the beach.

A popular recreation area just five-minutes drive from Tutong town, the beach's appeal is the effect created by a narrow spit of land that separates the mirror-smooth Tutong River from the ruffled waters of South China Sea. Chalets, restaurant, huts, a playground and food stall are available.

A little further along, the road passes the village of Kuala Tutong sheltered amidst a forest of coconut palms, to reach the old jetty. Until the Tutong Bridge was constructed in 1959, a ferry had to be used to travel between the southern district centers of Brunei and Bandar Seri Bagawan.

See also 

 List of spits

References 

Tutong District
Beaches of Brunei